Kauffman Glacier is a broad, smooth glacier,  long, flowing eastward into the head of Palmer Inlet on the east coast of Palmer Land, Antarctica. It was mapped by the United States Geological Survey in 1974, and named by the Advisory Committee on Antarctic Names for Thomas A. Kauffman, a United States Antarctic Research Program biologist and Station Scientific Leader at Palmer Station in 1973.

References

Glaciers of Palmer Land